Jeevana Jokali is a 1972 Indian Kannada-language film, directed by Geethapriya. The film stars Gangadhar, Bharathi, Suma and T. N. Balakrishna.

Cast
Gangadhar
Bharathi Vishnuvardhan
Suma
T. N. Balakrishna
M. N. Lakshmi Devi

Soundtrack
The music was composed by Vijaya Bhaskar.

References

External links

1972 films
1970s Kannada-language films
Films scored by Vijaya Bhaskar
Films directed by Geethapriya